Le drapeau belge ("The Belgian Flag") is a recitation with orchestral accompaniment written by the English composer Edward Elgar as his Op. 79, in 1917.  The words are by the Belgian poet  Émile Cammaerts. The poem reflects on the wartime meaning of the colours of the Belgian flag.

It was first performed at the birthday concert for King Albert I in the Queen's Hall, London, on 14 April 1917, with the recitation by Belgian dramatic performer Carlo Liten, and the orchestra conducted by Hamilton Harty.

On 15 August 1918, Le drapeau belge and Carillon were performed with success at a popular concert in Prospect Park, Brooklyn, with the recitations by Carlo Liten.

Lyrics
  
The original words were in French, and an English translation was provided by Lord Curzon of Kedleston.

Recordings
Elgar: War Music Richard Pascoe (narrator), Barry Collett (conductor), Rutland Sinfonia

References

Kennedy, Michael, Portrait of Elgar (Oxford University Press, 1968) 
Moore, Jerrold N. “Edward Elgar: a creative life” (Oxford University Press, 1984)

External links

Notes

Compositions by Edward Elgar
1917 compositions
Belgium in World War I